Renuar Locaj is an Albanian photographer. He won a Gold Award in the arts competition organized by Prix de la Photographie, Paris in 2017.

Early life and education 
Renuar Locaj was born in 14 April 1982 in Mirdite, Albania.  He acquired his first knowledge of figurative art through his father, Lin Loci, a well-known painter in Albania . in 1997, he attended the Art School Jordan Misja in Tirana. He later studied Arts at the University of Arts in Tirane, Albania. Locaj started working as an art director at his creative agency after graduating from the University.

Career 

Not long after his undertaking in the creative field, he began to work as a photographer. In 2017 he won the Gold Award in the category of Press/Performing Arts in the competition organized by Prix de la Photographie, Paris. 

In 2021 he opened his exhibition of photography in the documentary genre in the Albanian National and Historic Museum, which exhibited photos of refugees from the Middle East passing through the Albanian territory to The European Union.

Awards 
 2017 - PRIX Gold Award

References

External links
 Official website
  Renuar locaj on Facebook
  Renuar locaj on Instagram

Living people
Albanian photographers
Year of birth missing (living people)